Dimethoxanate (trade names Cothera, Cotrane, Atuss, Perlatoss, Tossizid) is a cough suppressant of the phenothiazine class.

Side effects
Dimethoxanate may have analgesic, local anesthetic, and central nervous system depressant effects, but it may also produce nausea and vomiting.

Pharmacology
It binds to the sigma-1 receptor in the brain with an IC50 of 41 nM.

Society and culture
Dimethoxanate was introduced in Austria, Belgium, and France in 1911, and in Italy and Spain in 1963.
Approval for marketing in the US was withdrawn by the FDA in 1975 due to lack of evidence of efficacy.

Synthesis

Phenothiazine (1) is reacted with phosgene to give Phenothiazine-10-carbonyl chloride [18956-87-1] (2). Further reaction with 2-(2-(dimethylamino)ethoxy)ethanol [1704-62-7] (3) completed the synthesis of Dimethoxanate (4).

References 

Phenothiazines
Antitussives
Sigma agonists
Carbamates
Ethers
Dimethylamino compounds